Tarnawsky, Tarnawski or Tarnavsky is a Slavic masculine surname, its feminine counterpart is Tarnawska or Tarnavskaya. It may refer to:
Men
Angus Tarnawsky, Australian musician
Mieczysław Tarnawski (1924–1997), Polish film and stage actor
Myron Tarnavsky (1869–1938), supreme commander of the Ukrainian Galician Army
Vladimiro Tarnawsky (born 1939), Ukrainian-born Argentine football goalkeeper
Yuriy Tarnawsky, American poet

Women
Joanna Tarnawska (born 1976), Polish diplomat
Rosalia Tarnavska (1932–2020), Ukrainian poet

See also
Tarnowski